General MacKinnon may refer to:

Henry MacKinnon (1773–1812), British Army major general
Henry Mackinnon (1852–1929), British Army general
William Alexander Mackinnon (British Army officer) (1830–1897), British Army lieutenant general